Nyländska Jaktklubben (NJK), Nyland Yacht Club, is a yacht club in Helsinki, Nyland (Finland).

History
The club was founded on March 4, 1861 with the approval of its constitution by Tsar Alexander II. His brother, Admiral-General Grand Duke Konstantin, officiated at the inauguration ceremony. In the same year, NJK received its first yachting ensign, based on the flag of the Neva Yacht Club of St. Petersburg: white with a blue cross (similar to the flag of Finland), with the crest of the district of Nyland (Uusimaa) in the upper inner corner. Today's flag, introduced in 1919, is the fourth version of the original. The official language of the club is Swedish.

In 1885 NJK came to Valkosaari. That same year the club's first pavilion was built. The present pavilion, designed by architects Estlander and Settergren, was inaugurated on August 31, 1900.

Harbours

Today NJK has two home harbours, Valkosaari and Koivusaari:
Valkosaari is one of the official guest harbours of Helsinki, receiving around 400 visiting yachts every year. During the summer the club house accommodates a public restaurant, which is a member of the Finnish Royal Restaurants (Royal Ravintolat). Blekholmen offers its guests toilets (24/7, showers, sauna and laundry-room. Water, electricity and septi-tanc emptying are also available.
Koivusaari is the NJK sailing centre. Situated on the western part of Lauttasaari island. with berths for 200 boats. Björkholmen is one of the busiest sailing centres in the capital region. The clubhouse, with the club office, is open all year round. It has a small café open for club members and kitchen and dining area for bigger occasions and events.

Sailing Center
NJK hosts one of the biggest sailing centers in Finland where you can sail without owning a boat. The Sailing Center has a total of 12 boats, 8 J/80 and 4 606. NJK Sailing Center organizes beginner sailing courses, weekly training on different levels and competitions.

See also

List of International Council of Yacht Clubs members

References

External links
Official Club website
Restaurant NJK 

Sports clubs established in 1861
Yacht clubs in Finland
Buildings and structures in Helsinki
Organisations based in Helsinki
Organizations with royal patronage
Sports clubs in Helsinki
1861 establishments in Finland